The Alexandria International 2015 is the women's edition of the 2015 Alexandria International, which is a tournament of the PSA World Tour event International (Prize money : 100 000 $). The event took place at the Library of Alexandria in Alexandria in Egypt from 4 June to 10 June. Raneem El Weleily won her first Alexandria International trophy, beating Omneya Abdel Kawy in the final.

Prize money and ranking points
For 2015, the prize purse was $100,000. The prize money and points breakdown is as follows:

Seeds

Draw and results

See also
2015 PSA World Series
El Gouna International 2015

References

External links
Alexandria International 2015 squashsite page

Squash in Egypt
PSA World Tour
Alexandria International
2015 in women's squash
2015 in Egyptian sport